Jess Edward Brooks (February 21, 1913 – June 2, 1992) was an American baseball third baseman in the Negro leagues. He played with the Kansas City Monarchs in 1937.

References

External links
 and Seamheads

Kansas City Monarchs players
1913 births
1992 deaths
People from Tacoma, Washington
Baseball players from Washington (state)
Baseball third basemen
20th-century African-American sportspeople